Humphrey IV de Bohun, 2nd Earl of Hereford, 1st Earl of Essex (1204 – 24 September 1275) was an Anglo-Norman nobleman and soldier who served as hereditary Constable of England.

Origins
He was the eldest son and heir of Henry de Bohun, 1st Earl of Hereford (1176–1220) by his wife Maud de Mandeville (alias Maud FitzGeoffrey), daughter and heiress of Geoffrey Fitz Peter, 1st Earl of Essex.

Career
He was one of the nine godfathers of Prince Edward, the future King Edward I. He served as Sheriff of Kent for 1239–40. In 1258, after returning from a pilgrimage to the Holy Land, Humphrey fell away, like his father, from the royal cause to that of the barons. He served as a nominee of the opposition on the "committee of twenty-four" which was appointed in the Oxford Parliament of that year, to create the Provisions of Oxford to reform the administration. The alliance of Simon de Montfort with Llywelyn ap Gruffudd of North Wales brought Bohun back to royal allegiance. He headed the first secession of the Welsh Marchers from the party of the opposition (1263), and was among the captives whom the Montfortians took at the Battle of Lewes in 1264. 

He was amongst the victors at the Battle of Evesham in 1265, which extinguished the power of de Montfort, at which, however, his eldest son, Humphrey V de Bohun, was mortally wounded. Humphrey was selected as one of the twelve arbitrators to draw up the Dictum of Kenilworth (1266), by which the disinherited rebels were allowed to make their peace.

Marriages and issue
He married twice:
Firstly, in about 1236, to Maud de Lusignan (c. 1210 – 14 August 1241), daughter of Raoul I of Lusignan, Comte d'Eu, second husband of Alix d'Eu, 8th Comtesse d'Eu. She died in 1241 and was buried at Llanthony, Gloucester, together with her husband. By Maud he had issue including:
Humphrey V de Bohun (died 1265), eldest son and heir apparent, who predeceased his father, having shared with him in the victory at the Battle of Evesham (1264), which he did not long survive. The earldom, therefore, passed to his son Humphrey VI de Bohun, 3rd Earl of Hereford, 2nd Earl of Essex (c. 1249 – 1298).
Henry de Bohun
Geoffrey de Bohun
Ralph de Bohun, Cleric;
Maud de Bohun, who married firstly Anselm Marshal, 6th Earl of Pembroke; secondly Roger de Quincy, 2nd Earl of Winchester;
Alice de Bohun, who married Roger V de Toeni;
Eleanor de Bohun, who married Sir John de Verdun, Baron of Westmeath
Secondly, he married Maud de Avenbury (died 8 October 1273), by whom he had two further sons:
John de Bohun
Sir Miles de Bohun

Death and burial 
He died in 1275 in Warwickshire and was buried at Llanthony Secunda in Gloucester. He was succeeded by his grandson Humphrey VI de Bohun (c. 1249 – 1298).

Notes

References

 Complete Peerage

1204 births
1275 deaths
02
01
13th-century English people
High Sheriffs of Kent
Bohun family